Bang Yi Khan is a khwaeng (subdistrict) of Bang Phlat District, Bangkok's Thonburi side (west bank of Chao Phraya River).

History
Its name after Khlong Bang Yi Khan, a small khlong (canal) that connect Chao Phraya River and other canals in the area such as Khlong Bang Bamru, Khlong Bang Chak, Khlong Pak Nam etc.

Bang Yi Khan dates back to Ayutthaya period since there are at least two temples with a history dating back to those times are Wat Bang Yi Khan, and Wat Phraya Siri Aiya Sawan.

In addition, there is also abandoned temple that have been built since the Ayutthaya period, namely Wat Suan Sawan, or locally known as Bot Rang ("abandoned sanctuary").

What makes Bang Yi khan the most well-known is the location of a liquor factory believed to have been established since the King Rama I's reign in early Rattanakosin period. Until during World War II this factory became under supervision of government and was named  "Bang Yi Khan Liquor Factory".

Told that in those days, yeasts that the factory released into Chao Phraya River, attract toli shad (Tenualosa toli) to swim from the sea into freshwater to eat them as food.

Currently, the liquor factory has been shut down and its location became a Rama VIII Memorial Park, a good atmosphere public park under the foot of Rama VIII Bridge.

The occupation of Bang Yi Khan residents in the past was the cultivation of rambutan and manufacture of lime for eating with betel and areca nut.

Pinklao is a popular name used to call this area (shares with Arun Amarin and Bang Bamru), this name after Phra Pinklao Bridge (usually shortened to Pinklao, or spelled Pin Klao), a bridge over Chao Phraya River and links Thonburi with Phra Nakhon sides, located in the area.

Geography
Bang Yi Khan is considered to be an area in the southeast of the district.

The area is bounded by other subdistricts (from north clockwise): Bang Phlat in its district (Ratchawithi Road is a divider line), Wachiraphayaban in Dusit District, Wat Sam Phraya, and Chana Songkhram in Phra Nakhon District (across Chao Phraya River), Arun Amarin in Bangkok Noi District (Somdet Phra Pin Klao Road is a divider line), and Bang Bamru in its district (Charansanitwong Road is a divider line).

Bang Yi Khan is also divided into 13 communities.

Bang Yi Khan Station (BL05), the extension of MRT Blue Line, indeed, it is overlaps between Bang Yi Khan and Bang Bamru.

Places
Rama VIII Bridge
Rama VIII Memorial Park and Chaipattana Foundation Headquarters
Pata Department Store and Pata Zoo
Phra Pin Klao Bridge and Phra Pin Klao Bridge Pier (N12)
Faculty of Physical Therapy, Mahidol University
Wat Daowadueng
Wat Kharuhabodi
Phong Sap Market
Thewphaingarm School
Khemasiri Memorial School
Canadian International School of Thailand
Krung Thon Bridge
Bang Yi Khan Metropolitan Police Station and Borwornmongkol Metropolitan Police Station
Praya Palazzo, also known as Ban Bang Yi Khan

References

Subdistricts of Bangkok
Bang Phlat district
Populated places on the Chao Phraya River